Quiz of God is a South Korean television series broadcast on cable channel OCN. It was the first medical/forensic crime investigation drama to air in Korea. The series follows genius but eccentric neurosurgeon and forensic doctor Han Jin-woo (played by Ryu Deok-hwan) and his team as they solve suspicious deaths and unravel mysteries involving rare diseases.

The title refers to a local saying that rare diseases are like quizzes God gives to humans so as not to become too arrogant. The first season dealt mostly with inherited rare diseases including porphyria, phenylketonuria, muscular dystrophy, Guillain–Barré syndrome, reflex anoxic seizures and Savant syndrome. Fabry disease, Kleine–Levin syndrome and congenital insensitivity to pain with anhidrosis were featured in the second season.

Series overview

Cast

Main
 Ryu Deok-hwan as Jin-woo Han, neurosurgeon and forensic doctor
 Yoon Joo-hee as Kyung-hee Kang, detective 
 Choi Jung-woo as Kyu-tae Jang 
 Park Joon-myun as Young-shil Jo, medical examiner
 Kim Dae-jin as Seong-do Kim, forensic scientist
 Ahn Nae-sang as Tae-shik Bae
 Lee Donghae as Han Shi-woo 
 Kim Jae-kyung as Im Tae-kyung
 Yoon Bo-ra as Jung Seung-bin
 Park Hyo-joo as Moon Soo-an
 Kim Jaewon as Hyeon Sang-pil

Recurring
 Park Da-an as Go Yoon-jung 
 Kim Geon-woo as Nam Joo-nam 
 Chu Seung-wook as Park Seung-wook
 Park Ji-a as Seo Yeon-joo	
 Ahn Yong-joon as Jung Ha-yoon
 Lee Seol-hee as Min Ji-yool
 Kim Se-hyun as Cha Woo-bin
 Lee Ha-rin as Lee Young-eun
 Park Hee-von as Lee Ran
 Han Seo-jin as Yoo So-yi
 Kang Sung-pil as Nam Ki-yong
 Han Seung-hyun as Gu Doo-jin
 Seo Yoo-jung as Shin Yeon-hwa
 Yoon Jin-young as Jo Il-yeob
 Choi Go as Han Jin-woo
 Kim Jun-han as Kwak Hyeok-min
 Han Ji-wan as Hong Na-yeo
 Kwon Eun-soo as Kim Han-sook
 Go Geon-han as Kang Soo-ha's son
 Kim Ki-doo as Nam Sang-bok
 Yoo Jung-rae as Lim Si-hyun

Guest appearances

 Kim Seung-yeon as psychic 
 Kim Tae-woo as Jae-seok (ep. 1)
 Kim Byung-ok as entertainment company CEO (ep. 2)
 Park No-shik as Choi Kyung-ho (ep. 3)
 Lee Ji-eun as Hong Seong-mi (ep. 3)
 Lim Hwa-young as Yeo-rang (ep. 4)
 Im Je-no as Joon-seo (ep. 5)
 Jung Eun-pyo as gynecologist (ep. 6)
 Lee Dal-hyung (ep. 7)
 Seo Ji-seung as Shi-eun (ep. 8)
 Ahn Yong-joon as Jung Ha-yoon (ep. 9–10)
 Yoo Hae-jung as Eun-ok, abused child

 Choi Sang-hak 
 Han Yeo-wool 
 Han Yeong-gwang as Lee Kyeong-seok 
 Lee Kyeong-in as Deok-hoon 
 Seo Han-gyeol 
 Lee Han-wi as chief of police 
 Kim Jong-seok 
 Kim Jeong-gyoon 
 Kang Seong-min as Jang in-ho (ep. 3)
 Oh Kwang-rok as Boss 
 Lee Il-hwa as Hwang Kyu-ri (ep. 5)
 Jeon Moo-song as a priest (ep. 12)
 Park Dae-won

 Yoo Jae-myung as Anesthesiologist Lee
 Park Jae-jung as Park Jong-min 
 Kim Ga-eun as Yoon So-jung 
 Hong So-hee as Shin Hee-soo 
 Jung Joon-won as Woo-ram (ep. 4)
 Alexander as Lee Han-seo (ep. 6)
 Yang Ohn-yoo as young Han-seo (ep. 6)
 Choi Ah-ra as Chae-kyung 
 Go Kyung-pyo as Seo In-gak (ep. 10–12)
 Kang Bit 
 Moon Ji-young as Mi-kyung 
 Yoon Joo-hee as Kang Kyung-hee (ep. 12)

 Lee Yoo as Min Ji-hee
 Lee Do-yeon as Da-mi
 Jang Seung-jo as Lee Jae-joon
 Lee Soo-yong as Park Jung-wook/Panna Nuen
 Cho Hye-jung as Jung Mi-hyang (ep. 1)
 Kim Jin-geun as Mi-hyang's father (ep. 1)
 Lim Yoon-ho as Ko Kyung-han (ep. 2)
 Park Min-ji as Park Ha-young (ep. 2)
 Song Ji-hyun as Ahn Hee-yeon (ep. 3)
 Hwang Seung-eon as Ahn Hyo-yeon (ep. 3)
 Choi Tae-hwan as Lee Soo-yong (ep. 4)
 Han Ki-won as Hong Ki-joon (ep. 4)
 Kim Heung-soo as Lee Jong-seok (ep. 5)
 Baek Bong-ki as Lee Hwan-seung (ep. 6)
 Kwon Eun-soo as Kim Han-sook (ep. 6)
 Jang Kyung-yeob as Lee Jong-hyuk (ep. 7)
 Seo Woo-jin as Kang Do-jin (ep. 7)
 Ji-soo as Kim Eun-shil (ep. 7)
 Sung Doo-sub as Lee Chul-min (ep. 8)
 Jang Se-hyun as Lee Woo-min (ep. 8)
 Jung So-young as Choi Seo-yeon (ep. 9)
 Kim Bo-mi as Go Gil-nyeo (ep. 10)
 Choi Ho-joong as Park Chan-hyung (ep. 10)
 Yang Geum-seok as Jang Hae-won, Jin-woo's mother (ep. 10–12)
 Choi Cheol-ho as Seo Sang-woo (ep. 11–12)

 Lee Sang-yi as Park Jae-sung (ep. 1,2)
 Lee Young-sook as Kim Soo-soon, Jae-sung's mother (ep. 2)
 Jung Myung-joon as Min Byung-tae (ep. 1,2)
 Kim Kyung-min as Jung Chang-man (ep. 2)
 Baek Su-ho as Im Doo-yeon (ep. 3,4)
 Jo Seung-yeon as Lee Jae-hyung (ep. 4)
 Park Se-hyun as Lee Ji-eun (ep. 4)
 Kim Dong-bum as Huh Sang-chan (ep. 3,4)
 Tak Woo-seok as Yoon Hyun-jong (ep. 5,6)
 Seo Yu-jeong as Shin Yeon-hwa (ep. 5,6)
 Han Seung-yong as Hwang Kyung-chul (ep. 5,6)
 Shin Young-eun as Yoon Se-eun (ep. 5,6)
 Jang Won as Kwon Young-pil (ep. 5,6)
 Hong Ji-young as Nam Sang-bok's sister (ep. 7,8)
 Yang Joo-ho as Nam Sang-bok's brother-in-law (ep. 7,8)
 Im Yoo-sung as Kim Seo-joon, Nam Sang-bok's nephew (ep. 7,8)
 Jeon Se-hyeon as Ra Hee-young (ep. 7,8)
 Oh Yoo-jin as Lee Eun-soo (ep. 7,8)
 Jang Won-hyuk as Yang Oh-soo (ep. 8)
 Jung Hye-rin as Oh Soo-young (ep. 8)
 Kang Jae-min as Shin Sun-woo (ep. 9,10)
 Jung Woo-young as Lee Young-rak (ep. 9,10)
 Choi Young-woo as Jeon Du-yeop (ep. 10)
 Kim Do-kyung as Ha Yoon-woo (ep. 10)

Character appearances

Episodes

Season 1 (2010)

Season 2 (2011)

Season 3 (2012)

Season 4 (2014)

Season 5: Reboot (2018-2019)

International broadcast
The first three seasons aired in Japan on BS-Japan, and the fourth season aired on DATV starting from December 16, 2014.

Notes

References

External links

Quiz of God – Season 3 official website 

Quiz of God – Season 4 official website 

Quiz of God – Season 5 (Reboot) official website 

OCN television dramas
Korean-language television shows
2010 South Korean television series debuts
South Korean medical television series